Ballycanew (historically Ballyconway, from ) is a small rural village in Ireland. This road is locally known as the "Coast Road".

History
The village was once known as Ballyconway. An old Irish name for Ballycanew is 'Baile Gan Uaigh' - Town without a grave.

The earliest reference is 1247 when Theodore de Nevel held lands there. In 1821, the population was 1094, but following the great famine it was reduced to 361.

In the past, the Furney family owned a mill, built in 1589 and demolished in 1962.

In June 1965, a Bronze Age grave was discovered in the Ballycanew Parish. This grave yielded a slightly damaged food vessel and broken human bones. The exact date of the burial is uncertain but is probably more than 3,000 years old.

Amenities
The area is served by a primary school, Saint Enda's National School. There are two churches. St Moling's is part of the Roman Catholic parish of Camolin, and St. Mogue's is part of Church of Ireland parish of Gorey. The village has two shops: a Daybreak and a Brooks
The village also has two pubs. One for the road and Goslings. It also has three community halls, a fast food place called Sizzles and also has a hairdressers called Tina's.
The Ounavarra River passes through the village.

Public transport
Bus Éireann bus route 879 serves Ballycanew on Tuesdays, Thursdays and Fridays linking it to Gorey. Route 379 serves Ballycanew on Mondays linking it to Gorey, Kilmuckridge and Wexford.

The nearest railway station is Gorey railway station on the Rosslare Europort to Dublin line.

See also
 List of towns and villages in Ireland

References

Towns and villages in County Wexford